is a 1973 Japanese existential drama directed by Masahiro Shinoda. The film is based on a novel by Japanese author and politician Shintarō Ishihara.

Plot 
The movie revolves around youth angst and a complicated relationship between mother and son. Haruo works in a university hospital trying to work toward a degree in medicine, but is hindered by his hatred of department head Mr. Miyaji. Meanwhile, he decides to get a rival in love out of the way by poisoning him. As the angst-ridden Haruo deals with his problems in his own unique ways, his nagging mother holds out hope that her son will soon return home.

Release
The Petrified Forest was released theatrically in Japan on 1 September 1973 where it was distributed by Toho.

Footnotes

Sources

External links

Toho films
Films directed by Masahiro Shinoda
1970s Japanese films